Mattingley is a village and large civil parish in Hampshire, England. The village lies on the Reading road between the town of Hook and Reading. The village has one pub, named the Leather Bottle.

Further reading
 W. J. James History of Heckfield and Mattingley

References

External links

 Mattingley Village Website Broken link.
 Mattingley Parish Council Broken link.
 Stained Glass Windows at Church, Mattingley, Hampshire Broken link.

Villages in Hampshire